Mikhail Kukushkin was the defending champion, but did not take part this year.

Borna Ćorić won the title by defeating Malek Jaziri 6–1, 6–7(7–9), 6–4 in the final.

Seeds

Draw

Finals

Top half

Bottom half

References
 Main Draw
 Qualifying Draw

Turk Telecom Izmir Cup - Singles
2014 Singles